Black Rock is an area of undeveloped land located near Brighton Marina in the city of Brighton and Hove. It was previously the site of a swimming pool that was demolished in the 1980s.

There is also an area just to the east of the Marina that is known as Black Rock. Here at low tides a vast area of black rocks can be seen that are excellent for nature observations for the likes of ecologists.

History
From at least the early 19th Century, Black Rock was the site of an inn and a few houses overlooking cliffs to the east of the then town of Brighton.

In 1922, Ralph Seymor, signal officer for Admiral David Beatty during WWI, committed suicide at Black Rock by jumping into the sea.

In 1936 an Art Deco lido was constructed at beach level, but this was closed in 1978 and demolished in 1979.

The area is served by an extension of the Volk's Electric Railway, which has remained in use thanks to the proximity of the marina, although the line was shortened when the marina and associated coastal defences were built in the early 1970s. The cliff-top houses were also lost to allow for the marina's approach roads. A new Black Rock railway terminus station was constructed in the 1990s, controversially slightly off-centre when compared with the terraces behind it which lead up to Lewes Crescent, Kemp Town.

Future
Brighton and Hove City Council have plans to develop the site with a predominantly leisure use. From 2007 there have been plans to construct a multi-purpose sports arena with adjacent ice rink, however in July 2012 the Council considered those plans were no longer viable and decided to seek a new development partner.

See also
 Brighton to Newhaven Cliffs, a Site of Special Scientific Interest (SSSI), extending eastwards from Black Rock.

References

External links
Pictures and information about Black Rock at My Brighton and Hove
Black Rock development, Brighton & Hove City Council
Volk's Electric Railway

Areas of Brighton and Hove